Medardo Fantuzzi (1906–1986) was an Italian automotive engineer, known for his Carrozzeria Fantuzzi body workshop.

Life
Fantuzzi was born in Bologna in 1906 and died in Modena in 1986.

Automotive engineer
He and his brother, Gino Fantuzzi were famous for their affiliation with Maserati, where they got involved in building the Maserati A6 GCS (44 built 1953–55), Maserati 350S and Maserati 200S. Later, Medardo worked for Ferrari (until 1966), known for building the Pininfarina-penned Ferrari 250 Testa Rossa Spyder Fantuzzi (1961); the workshop also did one-off Ferrari 250 GTE and a Ferrari 330. 
Fantuzzi also built, in the early 1960s, an OSCA Barchetta 1500cc 372FS for one of their mechanics.

Medardo's Carrozzeria Fantuzzi designed the bodywork for the one-off Ferrari that Terence Stamp drove in Federico Fellini's "Spirits of the Dead" motion picture.

He also worked for De Tomaso, Scuderia Serenissima, AMS and Tecno.  His son is Fiorenzo Fantuzzi of Modena.  The body workshop is still in existence.

Gallery

References

Italian automobile designers
Engineers from Bologna
1906 births
1986 deaths